The Lake City and Rochester Stage Road was an early road between Lake City and Rochester, Minnesota, United States.  It was blazed in 1858 to carry stagecoach traffic between the Mississippi River port and a major inland town in southeast Minnesota.

History
Construction of the Lake City and Rochester Stage Road was funded by a group of property owners in Lake City, Minnesota, who hoped to funnel trade from the interior through their river port community.  They also subsidized a stagecoach line operated by the Northwestern Express Company, which became the Minnesota Stage Company the following year.  Work on the  route began in spring 1858 and the stagecoach company was completing daily runs by mid-May.  The route was advertised as the shortest between Rochester and the Mississippi River, and superior in condition to all alternatives.  In 1859 the U.S. government requested bids from private contractors to deliver mail along the route and received 22, making it one of the most sought-after mail routes in the state.

The Lake City and Rochester Stage Road was blazed near the end of a six-year frenzy of road building in southeast Minnesota.  These new transportation connections spurred the region's development.  The stage road to Lake City was effective in helping the river port flourish.

Southeast Minnesota's stage roads diminished in importance in 1867 when a railroad line opened between Waseca and Winona, becoming the preferred route to the Mississippi.  The route of the Lake City and Rochester Stage Road was eventually straightened and became a leg of U.S. Route 63.

Mount Pleasant Section
When the Lake City and Rochester Stage Road was straightened and incorporated into the modern highway system, a curving  was abandoned and remains much as it appeared in the mid-19th century. It comprises a  dirt path curving through undeveloped woods. It was listed on the National Register of Historic Places in 1991 as the Lake City and Rochester Stage Road-Mount Pleasant Section for its state-level significance in the theme of transportation.

References

1858 establishments in Minnesota
Historic trails and roads in Minnesota
Transport infrastructure completed in 1858
Transportation in Olmsted County, Minnesota
Transportation in Wabasha County, Minnesota